This is a list of shows that have aired on Star Channel. Shows currently aired on the network are in bold.
Shows with a star symbol (★) are available on Star+; those with a plus symbol (+) are available on Disney+ in Latin America.

0-9
1 Contra Todos (first-run on Star Premium) ★
1600 Penn
24
24: Legacy
24: Live Another Day
2091
9mm: São Paulo
9-1-1 ★
9-1-1: Lone Star ★

A
Ally McBeal
American Dad! ★
American Horror Story ★
Angel ★
Arrested Development

B
Back in the Game
Bare Knuckle Fighting Championship ★
Batman
Bia (from Disney Channel, only for Mexico, Colombia, Argentina and Brazil) +
Bless This Mess ★
Bob's Burgers ★
Bones ★
Boston Legal
Boston Public
Buffy the Vampire Slayer ★
Burn Notice ★

C
Casados con Hijos (not seen in Brazil)
Chicago Hope
Contos do Edgar (seen only in Brazil)
The Cool Kids
The Crazy Ones
Criminal Minds ★
Cumbia Ninja ★

D
Da Vinci's Demons
Dark Angel
Dexter
Dharma & Greg
Doc McStuffins: Toy Hospital (from Disney Junior, seen only in Mexico and Brazil) +
Don't Trust the B---- in Apartment 23 ★
Duncanville ★

E
Endgame (not seen in Brazil)

F
Family Guy ★
Fancy Nancy Clancy (from Disney Junior, seen only in Mexico and Brazil) +
Fat Actress
Father of the Pride
The Finder
Firefly
Fresh Off the Boat +
Futurama ★

G
Get Real
The Gifted +
girls club
Glee +
The Glee Project
God, The Devil and Bob
Greg the Bunny
Grey's Anatomy (first-run on Sony Channel) ★
The Green Hornet

H
High Stakes Poker
How I Met Your Mother ★
The Hughleys

I
Ilha da Sedução (seen only in Brazil)
The Inside

J
The Job
Judging Amy

K
Kdabra ★
King of the Hill

L
Lie to Me
Life in Pieces
Life on a Stick
The Lion Guard (from Disney Junior, seen only in Mexico and Brazil) +
Lipstick Jungle
The Listener
The Lone Gunmen
Love Cruise

M
Malcolm in the Middle +
Married... with Children
Martial Law
Me Chama de Bruna
Mental
Mentes en Shock
The Mick
Mickey and the Roadster Racers (from Disney Junior, seen only in Mexico and Brazil) +
Mighty Morphin Power Rangers
Millennium
Minority Report
The Mob Doctor
Modern Family ★
Muppet Babies (2018) (from Disney Junior, seen only in Mexico and Brazil) +
My Name is Earl ★
My Wife & Kids ★

N
New Girl ★
The New Normal
Nip/Tuck
Nivis, Amigos de otro mundo (from Disney Junior, seen only in México and Brazil) +
NYPD Blue ★

O
One Tree Hill
Outcast (first-run on Fox Premium)

P
Playing House
Politicamente Incorreto (second-run, first-run on FX and seen only in Brazil)
Porta na Fox (seen only in Brazil)
The Practice
Prison Break ★
Puppy Dog Pals (from Disney Junior, seen only in Mexico and Brazil) +

R
Reba
Rescue Me
Roswell

S
Scream Queens ★
Se Eu Fosse Você (seen only in Brazil)
Shark
The Simple Life
The Simpsons (September, 1993–present; Season 32 onwards currently exclusive to Star+) ★/+
Sleepy Hollow ★
Snoops
Sons of Tucson
Speechless
Stargate Atlantis
Stargate SG-1
Still Standing
S.W.A.T. (currently seen on linear television on AXN) ★

T
Talento FOX
Temptation Island
Terra Nova ★
Titus
This Is Us ★
T.O.T.S.: Tiny Ones Transport Service (from Disney Junior, seen only in Mexico and Brazil) +
Touch
Tru Calling
Two Guys and a Girl

U
Undeclared
United States of Tara

V
Vampirina (from Disney Junior, seen only in Mexico and Brazil) +

W
The Walking Dead (moved to Star+) ★
Wayward Pines
White Collar ★
Will & Grace (revival)
Women's Murder Club
Wonderfalls
The Wrong Coast

X
''The X-Files ★

Fox Latin America